Kontich-Lint is a railway station in the town of Kontich, Antwerp, Belgium. The station opened on 2 May 1836 on the 13, Lines 25 and 27. The train services are operated by National Railway Company of Belgium (NMBS).

Train services
The station is served by the following services:

Brussels RER services (S1) Antwerp - Mechelen - Brussels - Waterloo - Nivelles (weekdays)
Brussels RER services (S1) Antwerp - Mechelen - Brussels (weekends)

References

External links
 Kontich railway station at Belgian Railways website

Railway stations in Belgium
Railway stations in Antwerp Province
Kontich
Railway stations in Belgium opened in 1836